War of the Colossal Beast (a.k.a. Revenge of the Colossal Man and The Colossal Beast) is a 1958 black-and-white science fiction film, written, produced, and directed by Bert I. Gordon for his Carmel Productions, and starring Dean Parkin, Sally Fraser, and Roger Pace. It is the sequel to Gordon's earlier The Amazing Colossal Man (1957) and was distributed theatrically by American International Pictures as the top half of a double feature with Attack of the Puppet People. The film's storyline picks up where The Amazing Colossal Man left off, although it was not marketed as a sequel and features a different cast. The film's brief death-scene finale was filmed in color.

Plot
Upon hearing of several recent robberies of food delivery trucks in Mexico, Joyce Manning (Sally Fraser), Army officer Lt. Colonel Glenn Manning's sister, becomes convinced that her brother (Dean Parkin) survived after being exposed to radiation from an atomic bomb (as seen in The Amazing Colossal Man). Along with Army officer Major Mark Baird (Roger Pace) and scientist Dr. Carmichael (Russ Bender), Joyce goes to Mexico to look for Glenn and finds that he has, in fact, survived, but was left disfigured and nearly mindless by the trauma of his fall. Manning is eventually captured, drugged by the Army, and transported back to the United States. He is able to escape again and goes on a rampage through Los Angeles and Hollywood. He nearly kills a school bus full of children. Joyce reasons with him, and he slowly is brought back to his senses. Now realizing what he has become and what he has done, Manning commits suicide by electrocuting himself on high-voltage power lines near the Griffith Observatory.

Cast
 Duncan "Dean" Parkin as Lt. Colonel Glenn Manning/Colossal Man
 Sally Fraser as Joyce Manning
 Roger Pace as Major Mark Baird 
 Russ Bender as Dr. Carmichael
 Rico Alaniz as Sgt. Luis Murillo
 Charles Stewart as Captain Harris
 George Becwar as John Swanson
 Roy Gordon as Mayor
 Robert Hernandez as Miguel
 George Milan as General Nelson

Production
War of the Colossal Beast was produced, directed, and written by Bert I. Gordon and co-produced with Samuel Z. Arkoff. Although most of it is shot in black-and-white, the ending was shot in color for the electrocution scene and doctored in black-and-white. The producers decided to use the very heavy make-up on Dean Parkin as a way to disguise the fact that a different actor was playing Colonel Manning, especially since a dream sequence flashing back to the original film featured Glenn Langan, the star of the earlier film. Dean Parkin also played the lead monster role in another Bert I. Gordon film, The Cyclops.

Some of the tiny-sized props created for The Amazing Colossal Man by special effects technician Paul Blaisdell were featured again in this sequel via flashbacks.

Reception and legacy
Contemporary film fan-historians Kim R. Holston and Tom Winchester noted that the film was "... a low-budget ship with Bert Gordon at the helm, so the special effects are unsurprisingly average; one always knows the 'giant' was filmed separately and mixed in with other shots".

Mystery Science Theater 3000
War of the Colossal Beast was featured in season 3, episode 19 of Mystery Science Theater 3000. The Amazing Colossal Man was also shown in season 3. Mike Nelson again portrayed the film's title character. As opposed to his first encounter with Joel and the Bots, he shows more gentleness to them after seeing the transmission picked up by his "goofy dental work", but is still somewhat adamant when he tells them why Bert I. Gordon did not pick him for the sequel.

Svengoolie
War of the Colossal Beast was featured on the September 4, 2021 episode of Svengoolie. The show featured the usual trivia, jokes and song about the film which was being shown that week.

See also
 List of American films of 1958
 Attack of the 50 Foot Woman

References

Notes

Citations

Bibliography

 Holston, Kim R. and Tom Winchester. Science Fiction, Fantasy and Horror Film Sequels, Series and Remakes: An Illustrated Filmography. Jefferson, North Carolina: McFarland & Company, 1997. .
 Warren, Bill. Keep Watching the Skies! American Science Fiction Movies of the Fifties, 21st Century Edition. Jefferson, North Carolina: McFarland & Company, 2009 (First Edition published in 1982). .

External links

 
 
 
 Said MST3K episode on Shout Factory TV

1958 films
1950s monster movies
1950s science fiction films
American International Pictures films
American black-and-white films
American science fiction films
American monster movies
American sequel films
1950s English-language films
Giant monster films
Films about giants
Films directed by Bert I. Gordon
Films scored by Albert Glasser
Films about size change
Films set in Los Angeles
1950s American films